Flacourtia jangomas, the Indian coffee plum, or  scramberry, is a lowland and mountain rain forest tree in the family Salicaceae. It is widely cultivated in Southeast and East Asia, and has escaped cultivation in a number of places.  Its wild origin is unknown but is speculated to be tropical Asia, most perhaps India.  This tree is very common in the Southern India and is of culinary and medical importance, especially in Kerala where it is commonly known as lubikka or lololikka. Fruits are eaten both raw and cooked as a jam or pickes, and the bark is sometimes used medicinally.  It is sometimes harvested for its lumber.  The plant is considered one of the primary host plants of the Queensland fruit fly (Bactrocera tryoni)

Description
Flacourtia jangomas is a small, deciduous shrub or tree that grows to a height of 6-10m. Trunk and branches are commonly thornless in old trees, but densely beset with simple or branched, blunt woody thorns when younger. Bark is light-brown to copper-red with a flaky texture and the leaves are light green and narrow ovate in shape. It produces small white to whitish green fragrant flowers. The relatively juicy fruits are rounded pink to dark red and about an inch wide.

Common names

 Bengali: , লুকলুকি
 Assamese:  (পনিয়ল)
 English: Indian coffee plum, Indian sour cherry, rukam, runeala plum, scramberry
 Hindi:  (तालिसपत्री), Pani amla (पानी आमला)
 Manipuri:  ( হৈত্ৰোঈ )
 Konkanni: Jagomma
 Thai: 
 Rohingya, Chittagonian: 
 Sanskrit: ,  (स्रुववृक्ष)
 Sylheti:  (ꠟꠥꠇꠟꠥꠇꠤ), kulkuli (ꠇꠥꠟꠇꠥꠟꠤ)
 Malayalam:  (ലൂബിക്ക),  (ലൗലോലിക്ക), 
 Tamil: 
 Mizo: 
 Malay: 
 Castellano Panama:  Uva de Monte,  Uvita,  Guinda.

Uses

Food
Flacourtia jangomas fruits are widely eaten around South Asia, both raw and cooked. They are noted for their mild sour and tangy taste. The fruits are pickled, salt-dried or cooked in Indian curries. They can also be blended into juices or made into jams and marmalades which are immensely popular in Southern India. Commercially produced Coffee plum jams and pickles are exported across the world by various companies, mainly from Kerala.

Medicine
In South Asian folkloric medicine, the fruits and leaves of Indian coffee plum are used against diarrhea. Dried leaves are reportedly effective for bronchitis and roots are said to suppress toothache. The bark of Flacourtia jangomas has various antifungal and antibacterial constituents which makes it an important ingredient for a few Ayurvedic drugs. Ground bark paste is also used for curing many common ailments in the tribal settlements of Western Ghat.

Lumber
The wood is sometimes harvested for lumber in the Indian states of Tamil Nadu, Kerala and Karnataka. It is often used as a cheaper alternative to Teak and other expensive wood.

References

jangomas